This is a glossary of terms common in MUD multiplayer virtual worlds.

A–Z

See also 

 Glossary of video game terms

References

Bibliography 

 
 
 

 
Computing terminology
Video game terminology
Video game lists
Glossaries of computers
Wikipedia glossaries using description lists